The Panasonic Lumix G X Vario PZ 45-175mm lens 4.0-5.6  lens is a zoom lens for Micro Four Thirds system cameras. In the Micro Four Thirds format, it is moderately to long telephoto.

The lens has both manual and power zoom (via a rocker switch), useful for smooth zoom motion during videography. Focusing is quiet. The lens has Panasonic's "nano surface coating" for increased contrast and reduced flare. The front of the lens neither extends nor rotates, beneficial for polarized filters. The 46mm thread diameter allows sharing of filters with the Panasonic 14mm, 15mm, 20mm, 25mm, 45mm, Olympus M.Zuiko Digital ED 12mm f/2 and Olympus M.Zuiko Digital 25mm f/1.8 lenses.

External links

References

045-175